The 2009–10 Irish League Cup (known as the Co-operative Insurance Cup for sponsorship reasons) was the 24th edition of Northern Ireland's secondary football knock-out cup competition. The tournament started on 28 August 2009 with the first round and ended on 27 March 2010 with the Final. The cup was contested by the 12 members of the IFA Premiership and the 14 members of IFA Championship 1.

Portadown were the defending champions after their second League Cup win last season; a 1–0 victory over Newry City in the previous final. This season however, they went out at the semi-final stage to eventual winners Glentoran, who defeated Coleraine 4–1 on penalties in the final after the game finished 2–2 following extra time. This was Glentoran's seventh League Cup win, and the eleventh time in thirteen years that the cup had been won by one of Belfast's Big Two.

First round
The first legs were played on 28, 29 August and 1 October 2009. The second legs were played on 7 and 22 September 2009.

|}

Second round
The first legs were played on 26 September 2009. The second legs were played on 6 and 7 October 2009.

|}

Third round
In this round entered winners from the previous round together with all 12 teams from IFA Premiership. The first legs were played on 31 October and 10 November 2009. The second legs were played 10 November and 1 December 2009.

|}

Quarter-finals
The first legs were played on 5 December 2009. The second legs were played on 15 December 2009.

|}

Semi-finals

Final

References

Lea
Irish League Cup seasons
Irish League Cup